Öndörshireet is a sum of Töv Province in Mongolia. Sum center former location was 47 28 N 104 52 E.

Districts of Töv Province